The Secret Life of Bill Clinton: The Unreported Stories is a critical biography  about  certain  episodes during  the administration of former United States president  Bill Clinton by  English  author and investigative journalist Ambrose Evans-Pritchard.

Content
The book, published in 1997 by Regnery Publishing,  Washington, D.C, an imprint of  Eagle Publishing caused controversy in  the USA. Evans-Pritchard, the author, at  the time was chief editor in  Washington DC for the Sunday Telegraph. In  particular, the book investigates  the death of former deputy White House counsel Vincent Foster.

Evans-Pritchard had initially intended the book to be titled The Secret History of the Clinton Presidency, in reference to Secret History, a sixth-century book by Procopius of Caesarea "about Justinian and Theodora and the wicked things that went on in the Byzantine court - the salacious gossip and terrible goings-on and murders and so forth".

The Secret Life makes various allegations about Clinton, including drug use, visits to prostitutes and dishonesty.
In  the book he also repeats the Oklahoma City bombing conspiracy theory that the Oklahoma City bombing was an FBI sting operation that went horribly wrong, that warnings by an ATF undercover agent were ignored, and that the Justice Department subsequently engaged in a cover-up.

In Clinton's America, Evans-Pritchard alleged: "The way American reporters cover Arkansas is exactly the way they covered Nicaragua, which is they didn't go out into the hills and talk to ordinary people."

Reaction
Evans-Pritchard's work has been criticized as: "little more than wild flights of conspiratorial fancy coupled with outrageous and wholly uncorroborated allegations", although Robert Novak defends Evans-Pritchard as: "...being no conspiracy-theory lunatic.... [H]e was known in Washington for accuracy, industry and courage."

However, long-time Clinton defender Gene Lyons, columnist for the Arkansas Democrat-Gazette and author of Fools for Scandal: How the Media Invented Whitewater (Franklin Square Press, 1996), says in an article: 'When necessary, Evans-Pritchard resorts to even more questionable methods. The temptation, in addressing so manifestly absurd and error-filled a piece of work, is to raillery. In form, Evans-Pritchard's book is a feverish concatenation of what his countryman, Guardian Washington correspondent Martin Walker, calls "the Clinton legends" into one vast, delusional epic.'

References

External links
 Ambrose Evans-Pritchard: Transcript (abbreviated) of C-Span interview from 26 October 1997
 Audio of telephone conversation of Ambrose Evans-Pritchard with Reed Irvine from October 28, 1995

1997 non-fiction books
American biographies
American political books
Biographies about politicians
Books about the Clinton administration
Books about Bill Clinton